Joseph Francis McShane (29 November 1868 – 26 July 1950) was an Australian rules footballer in the Victorian Football League (VFL).

Family
The son of Philip McShane (1835-1908), and Mary Ann McShane (1836-1912), née McCabe, Joseph Francis McShane was born at Geelong on 29 November 1868.

His brother, Patrick George McShane (1858–1903), played football for Fitzroy and Geelong in the VFA, and played Test Cricket for Australia.

He married Joanna Ryan (1862-1932), at Melbourne, on 5 July 1882.

Football

Geelong (VFA/VFL)
One of the six McShane brothers who played in the VFA or VFL (or both) for Geelong, McShane started his career at Geelong in the Victorian Football Association (VFA) in 1887, and played 210 games for the club (135 in the VFA and 75 in the VFL), becoming the first Geelong player to play 200 games for the club before moving to Carlton in 1902.

1899
In 1899, he was the first player to kick 10 or more goals in a VFL/AFL game, scoring 11 against St Kilda, whose one-point total in the same match become the still-standing record for the lowest-score by a team in VFL/AFL history.

At the end of the 1899 season, in the process of naming his own "champion player", the football correspondent for The Argus ("Old Boy"), selected a team of the best players of the 1899 VFL competition:
Backs: Maurie Collins (Essendon), Bill Proudfoot (Collingwood), Peter Burns (Geelong)
Halfbacks: Pat Hickey (Fitzroy), George Davidson (South Melbourne), Alf Wood (Melbourne)
Centres: Fred Leach (Collingwood), Firth McCallum (Geelong), Harry Wright (Essendon)
Wings: Charlie Pannam (Collingwood), Eddie Drohan (Fitzroy), Herb Howson (South Melbourne)
Forwards: Bill Jackson (Essendon), Eddy James (Geelong), Charlie Colgan (South Melbourne)
Ruck: Mick Pleass (South Melbourne), Frank Hailwood (Collingwood), Joe McShane (Geelong)
Rovers: Dick Condon (Collingwood), Bill McSpeerin (Fitzroy), Teddy Rankin (Geelong).
From those he considered to be the three best players — that is, Condon, Hickey, and Pleass — he selected Pat Hickey as his "champion player" of the season.

Carlton (VFL)
McShane retired following the 1904 Grand Final against Fitzroy: at the time, his career total of 258 games was second in elite Victorian football behind his longtime Geelong teammate Peter Burns (305 games, 216 in the VFA and 89 in the VFL), and third in elite Australian rules football behind Burns and the South Australian Jack "Dinny" Reedman (281 games, would retire at the end of 1909 with 319 games).

Death
He died at the Caritas Christi Hospice, in Kew, Victoria on 26 July 1950.

Notes

References
 Holmesby, Russell & Main, Jim (2002), The Encyclopedia of AFL Footballers: every AFL/VFL player since 1897 (4th ed.), Melbourne, Victoria: Crown Content. 
 Football Memories: Joe McShane's Experiences: Ruck-Man and Captain, The Geelong Advertiser, (Saturday, 30 August 1924), p.4.
 'M. M. McC.', "The Famous Six McShane Bothers", The Sporting Globe, (Saturday, 3 October 1936), p.8.

External links

 
 
 Joe McShane at Blueseum

1868 births
1950 deaths
Australian rules footballers from Geelong
Australian Rules footballers: place kick exponents
Geelong Football Club (VFA) players
Carlton Football Club players
Geelong Football Club players
Carji Greeves Medal winners